Hugh Lupton is a British storyteller, one of the most prominent figures in the tradition of oral storytelling.

Early life and career
Lupton was born in 1952, the eldest child of Francis G. H. Lupton and Mary Gee/Lupton. He is the great nephew of Arthur Ransome (1884-1967) whom, as a boy, he often visited. Lupton can recall hearing his great uncle's classic children's stories set in Norfolk and the Lake District. "He (Ransome) was very old by then, in his dotage, but I remember him and stories were very important as I grew up."  Lupton was born in Cambridgeshire, where there was much family heritage, and educated at the King's College School, Cambridge. He studied to become a teacher in Norwich. As of 2013 he was based at Spratt's Green near Aylsham.

Lupton tells a wide variety of stories, including epics such as Iliad and Odyssey, but also collections of shorter stories such as I become part of it (tales from the pre-world) and folktales such as The Three Snake Leaves (tales from the Grimm Forest).

Children's books
 Freaky Tales from Far and Wide (1999)
 Norfolk Songline: Walking the Peddars Way (2000)
 The Songs of Birds: Poems and Stories from Many Cultures (2000)
 Tales of Wisdom and Wonder (2000), ill. Niamh Sharkey
 Pirican Pic and Pirican Mor (2003)
 The Gingerbread Man (2003)
 The Story Tree: Tales to Read Aloud (2005), ill. Sophie Fatus
 Riddle Me this: Riddles and Stories to Sharpen Your Wits (2007), ill. Sophie Fatus
 Tales of Mystery and Magic (2010), ill. Agnese Baruzzi
 la voz de los sueñosy otros cuentos(2003)
With Daniel Morden
Lupton and the Welsh storyteller Daniel Morden have written several volumes retelling ancient Greek stories.
 The Adventures of Odysseus (2006), illustrated by Christina Balit
 The Adventures of Achilles (2012), ill. Carole Hénaff
 Theseus and the Minotaur (2013), ill. Hénaff
 Orpheus and Eurydice (2013), ill. Hénaff
 Demeter and Persephone (2013), ill. Hénaff
 Greek Myths: Three Heroic Tales (2017), ill. Carole Hénaff

Awards
Lupton won the "Hodja Cup" (named for the Mulla Nasreddin: "The truth is something I have never spoken.") at The Crick Crack Club's renowned Grand Lying Contest in 2010.

References

External links
 
 Lupton at Facebook
 Beyond the Border International Storytelling Festival
 

Living people
British storytellers
English children's writers
People from Cambridgeshire
Place of birth missing (living people)
People from Broadland (district)
1952 births